Code enforcement, sometimes encompassing law enforcement, is the act of enforcing a set of rules, principles, or laws (especially written ones) and ensuring observance of a system of norms or customs. An authority usually enforces a civil code, a set of rules, or a body of laws and compel those subject to their authority to behave in a certain way.

In the United States, those employed in various capacities of code enforcement may be called Code Enforcement Officers, Municipal Regulations Officers, or with various titles depending on their specialization.

In the United Kingdom, Australia and New Zealand, various names are used, but the word Warden is commonly used for various classes of non-police enforcement personnel (such as Game Warden, Traffic Warden, Park Warden).

In Canada and some Commonwealth Countries, the term Bylaw Enforcement Officer is more commonly used, as well as Municipal Law Enforcement Officer or Municipal Enforcement Officer.

In Germany order enforcement offices are established under the state's laws and local regulations under different terms like Ordnungsamt (order enforcement office), Ordnungsdienst (order enforcement service), Gemeindevollzugsdienst (municipal code enforcement office), Polizeibehörde (police authority), Stadtwacht (municipal guard/municipal watch) or Stadtpolizei (city police) for general-duty bylaw enforcement units.

Various persons and organizations ensure compliance with laws and rules, including:
 Building inspector, an official who is charged with ensuring that construction is in compliance with local codes.
 Fire marshal, an official who is both a police officer and a firefighter and enforces a fire code.
 Health inspector, an official who is charged with ensuring that restaurants meet local health codes.
 Police forces, charged with maintaining public order, crime prevention, and enforcing criminal law.
 Zoning enforcement officer, an official who is charged with enforcing the zoning code of a local jurisdiction, such as a municipality or county.
 Parking enforcement officer, an official who is charged with enforcing street parking regulations.

See also 
 Codification
 Code of Federal Regulations
 Dress code
 National Electrical Code
 International Building Code
 Legal code
 Fire code
 Penal code
 Traffic code
 Nuisance abatement
 Trading Standards

External links 
 National Association of Code Enforcement Officers & Investigators

Regulation
Safety codes